Nephradenia is a genus of plants in the family Apocynaceae, first described as a genus in 1844. They are native to South America.

Species

formerly included
transferred to other genera (Blepharodon, Marsdenia)

References

 
Apocynaceae genera
Taxa named by Joseph Decaisne